Nikolay Anfimov (born 28 December 1950) is a Uzbekistani boxer. He competed in the men's light heavyweight event at the 1972 Summer Olympics.

References

1950 births
Living people
Soviet male boxers
Uzbekistani male boxers
Olympic boxers of the Soviet Union
Boxers at the 1972 Summer Olympics
People from Samarkand
Light-heavyweight boxers